Edmund Sheffield, 1st Earl of Mulgrave, 3rd Baron Sheffield, KG (7 December 1564 – 6 October 1646) was a British peer and Member of Parliament, who served as Lord Lieutenant of Yorkshire from 1603 to 1619 and Vice-Admiral of Yorkshire from 1604 to 1646. He was created Earl of Mulgrave in 1626.

He was the son of John Sheffield, 2nd Baron Sheffield and Douglas Howard, and the grandson of Sir Edmund Sheffield. His grandfather, a second cousin of Henry VIII, was raised to the Peerage in 1547 as Baron Sheffield, of Butterwick, and in 1549 was murdered in the streets of Norwich during Kett's Rebellion.

He married, firstly, Ursula Tyrwhitt, by whom he had at least one daughter, Mary Sheffield and, secondly, Mariana Irwin.

He was succeeded by his grandson, likely via his second wife Mariana Irwin, Edmund Sheffield, 2nd Earl of Mulgrave.

Ancestry

References

1564 births
1646 deaths
Knights of the Garter
Lord-Lieutenants of Yorkshire
Edmund
16th-century English nobility
English MPs 1604–1611
Earls of Mulgrave
17th-century English nobility
Barons Sheffield